Ap Bokto is a 2014 Bhutanese 3D computer-animated film produced and directed by Karma Dhendup under Athang Animation Studio.

The film was the first Bhutanese 3D animation film to be made and the first animated film to be based from a Bhutanese folk tale. The story of the film revolves around Ap Bokto who encounters and outwits several wild animals whose goal is to make him as their meal.

Production
Production for the film took more than 2 years with a budget of Nu. 4.5 million. The production team was composed of 30 people. The animation was created with Anim8or. Athang Animation Studio's proprietor, Karma Dhendup directed and produced the film. The film's duration is 53 minutes.

Cast
Ap Bokto 
(Voiced by:Phurba Thinley)
the main protagonist of the story.

Release
The film was first released in Thimphu in September 2014. The film was scheduled to be screened in other districts in the country but the screening were halted following reports of unauthorized leakage of the film.

Reception
Although the film was aimed at targeting kids above five years of age, it overwhelmingly poured in viewers as young as one-and-a-half year old babies.
Internet traffic Analytics showed 30% of nearly half a million viewers of Ap Bokto's trailer on YouTube is from outside Bhutan and almost every country on earth have accessed this channel.
The film was positively received by the Bhutanese audience especially by children. By around March 2015, the film, including the relevant comics, has made money amounting to around 40 percent of the Nu. 4.5 million budget. Karma Dhendup has received invitations from European film festivals due to the film's success.

Synopsis
Ap Bokto serials are yet to be released and synopsis differs but all in line of its original shapes.

Leakage
Karma Dhendup said that he has received reports that his film. Dhendup's animation studio was approached by a woman who found a flash drive from a customer containing the final 3D copy of the film for theatrical release on February 6, 2015. Dhendup believes that the film could have been leaked as early as the end of January 2015. An investigation was conducted by the animation studio and it was suspected that the one who leaked the film came from the studio's office. Dhendup said that he heard copies of the film reached India. By April 2015, the list of those suspected to have leaked the film has been narrowed down to four people, with some of them with direct relations to Athang.

Purpose and objective making Ap Bokto
Athang aims to revive and document the Bhutanese folktales digitally. The artworks are also made available in the paper edition.
The producer feels that culture of oral tradition (Bhutanese folktales) is diminishing due to Bhutan's rapid socio-economic development. Accordingly, the decline in the oral tradition is on rise due to onslaught by introduction of TV and Internet in the country since 1999 and also by the influence of western culture into this minority ethnic tradition of Bhutan. 
Documenting those endangered Bhutanese folktale through digital presentation and publication was felt so that it helped children who are highly vulnerable to the western influence to be knowledgeable about the endangered culture.
The movie making used the Bhutanese context of culture and tradition such as in scene and set designing along with the characters development, and moreover, using the national language Dzongkha as the medium of the communication.
•	Retaining an intangible cultural heritage of Bhutan
As storytelling is less being practiced in modern Bhutan, there is a danger of some beautiful village stories are to be lost.  It is important that the stories to be recorded so that these invisible assets are kept.  In addition to other efforts to record old stories of Bhutan, this movie along with its book also contributes in retaining intangible heritage asset of Bhutan.  
•	Encouraging the creation of local arts and contents
Even at this time, very few movies, comics and picture books can be found that tells the real Bhutanese stories.  The story of Ap Bokto was meant to produce a sample, hoping that other Bhutanese artists might follow in similar form with more arts and more stories, if the Ap Bokto was well accepted.

References

Bhutanese animated films
2014 computer-animated films
Films based on folklore